Glenwood Power Station may refer to:

Glenwood Generating Station, a power station in Glenwood Landing, New York
Yonkers Power Station, an abandoned electrical plant in Glenwood, Yonkers, New York